The Carleton Ravens are the athletic teams that represent Carleton University in Ottawa, Ontario. The most notable sports team for Carleton is the men's basketball team. In men's basketball, the Ravens have won 16 of the last 19 national men's championships, which is more than any top division college in Canada or the United States. The Ravens went on an 87-game winning streak from 2003 to 2006. They also had a 54-game home winning streak. The Ravens finished 2nd in the World University Basketball Championships in 2004.

Outside basketball, the Ravens won the silver medal at the 2015 Winter Universiade in Granada. They are also the Men's Water Polo and Men's Fencing provincial champions.  The Men's Hockey team also placed 3rd in the province and made an appearance at nationals. Carleton participates in the Ontario University Athletics (OUA) Conference for all varsity sports, except the Women's Hockey and Rugby teams who play in Quebec Student Sport Federation (RSEQ).

Rivalry with the Gee-Gees 

Carleton's biggest rivals are the Ottawa Gee-Gees of the University of Ottawa. An annual football game known as the Panda Game is played between the cross-town rivals. It is the most well known rivalry game in Canadian collegiate football . Since its inception in 1955, the Gee-Gees have won 33 to Carleton's 13. From 1998 to 2012, Carleton did not have a football program so the Panda Game was not held.

Today, the rivalry has extended to the schools' basketball teams, as both universities have men's and women's teams that finish near the top of the standings. On January 23, 2007, the two men's basketball teams faced off at Scotiabank Place, now known as Canadian Tire Centre, in front of nearly 9,720 spectators, which was a record crowd for a regular season U Sports basketball game. The Ottawa Gee-Gees won the inaugural event 64–62. The event, now known as the Capital Hoops Classic, has been expanded to include the women's teams as well, with the Classic featuring a doubleheader of both teams. The January 28, 2009 edition of the game broke the 2007 record with 10,523 fans attending the two games, with both of Carleton's teams posting victories over Ottawa. In the 2013–14 season the teams faced each other both in the provincial and national finals, with uOttawa winning the OUA championship and Carleton winning the national title. In 2014-15, the two teams met again in the national championship game, with Carleton once again winning.

Teams 
 men's basketball 
 women's basketball
 fencing
football
 golf
 men's hockey
 women's hockey
 Nordic skiing
 rowing
 women's rugby
 men's soccer
 women's soccer
 swimming
 men's water polo
 women's water polo
 15 club sports: http://goravens.ca/clubs/

Men's basketball 

The Ravens have won 17 of the last 20 national championships (2003 to 2007, 2009, 2011 to 2017, 2019, 2020, 2022 and 2023). Below is their regular season record since 1996–97. Of note, they have captured the Wilson Cup 12 times.

Women's basketball 

Carleton's women's basketball program has become one of the most competitive in Canada, winning their first National Championship in 2018. They won a second national title in 2023.

Curling
Carleton won the national women's championship in 2014 and the national men's championship in 2019.

Women's field hockey 

The women's field hockey team has not participated in U Sports since 2010.

Football 

The Carleton Ravens football team returned to the Ontario University Athletics football conference in 2013 after a 15-year absence. Upon their return, the team was led by head coach Steve Sumarah from 2013 to 2021. In 2013, Sumarah predicted his team would play in the semi-finals within four years, and in 2016 the team accomplished that goal. After Sumarah was dismissed with a losing record over eight seasons, Corey Grant was hired as the team's head coach for the 2022 season. The football team plays at Keith Harris Stadium.

Historically, the Ravens football team first began play just after the Second World War in 1945 and was in continuous operation until the program was dropped in 1998. While the team had some success in the mid-1980s, poor performances and a plan by the Carleton Athletic department to invest more funds in other sports led to the sport being cut after the 1998 season. In their history, the Ravens won one Dunsmore Cup conference championship in 1985, but lost in the following Western Bowl to the Calgary Dinos 56 to 14.

Men's ice hockey 

The Carleton Ravens men's ice hockey team plays within the Ontario University Athletics conference of U Sports.

Former NHL hockey player Shaun Van Allen has led Carleton as head coach since the fall of 2017, when he took the program over from previous head coach Marty Johnston. Under Van Allen, the Ravens program has continued to be a consistently-.500 team into a perennial threat in the OUA's Eastern Conference. Despite a plethora of regular-season success, the program has repeatedly been handed early playoff exits by the arch-rival UQTR Patriotes. The Ravens overcame the Patriotes in the 2019 playoffs en route to winning the OUA Bronze medal.

Women's ice hockey

Men's soccer 
Carleton also has a soccer team. In 2002, the team lost the finals 1–0 in OT to the Brock Badgers. They were OUA champions again in 2005, but lost in the quarter-finals of the national championships. In 2012, the Ravens men's soccer team advanced to CIS (now U Sports) Nationals and finished in 6th place at the CIS Championship Finals.

Women's soccer 
Despite having successful regular seasons, the women's soccer team has had little success in the playoffs.

Men's golf 
Men's golf has had a long history at Carleton.  Despite many strong individual performances, the Ravens have struggled to find team success at the OUA stage.

Notable athletes 
Basketball
Ryan Bell
Aaron Doornekamp
Tyson Hinz
Osvaldo Jeanty
Kaza Kajami-Keane
Philip Scrubb
Thomas Scrubb
Stuart Turnbull
Dave Smart (coach)
Rob Smart (player, coach) 
Connor Wood

Curling
Lauren Horton
Lynn Kreviazuk
Jamie Sinclair

Football
Tunde Adeleke
Michael Allen
Nate Behar
Carl Coulter
Jason Kralt
Cameron Legault

Soccer
Gabriel Bitar

Athletes of the Year
This is an incomplete list

See also 
U Sports
U Sports men's basketball championship

References

External links 
 
 

 
U Sports teams
Sports teams in Ottawa